Dasht-e Soltanabad-e Yek (also Romanized as Dasht-e Solţānābād-e Yek; also known as Dasht-e Solţānābād) is a village in Kuhestan Rural District, Rostaq District, Darab County, Fars Province, Iran. At the 2006 census, its population was 212, in 45 families.

References 

Populated places in Darab County